Lily Broberg  (19 September 1923 – 30 July 1989) was a Danish stage and film actress.

Born in Skjørring, Skanderborg Municipality, Jutland, Denmark, she died in Frederiksberg and was buried at the Frederiksberg Ældre Kirkegård.

Filmography

References

External links

Danish stage actresses
Danish film actresses
1923 births
1989 deaths
People from Skanderborg Municipality
20th-century Danish actresses